Roth is an Ortsgemeinde – a municipality belonging to a Verbandsgemeinde, a kind of collective municipality – in the Rhein-Hunsrück-Kreis (district) in Rhineland-Palatinate, Germany. It belongs to the Verbandsgemeinde of Kastellaun, whose seat is in the like-named town.

Geography

Location
The municipality lies in the Hunsrück roughly 2 km northeast of Kastellaun and 14 km southeast of the Moselle at Treis-Karden.

Neighbouring municipalities
Clockwise from the north, these are Beltheim, Gödenroth, Kastellaun and Uhler.

History
In the Middle Ages, Roth belonged to the “Further” County of Sponheim. In 1417, the village passed along with the Amt of Kastellaun to the “Hinder” County of Sponheim. Beginning in 1794, Roth lay under French rule. In 1815 it was assigned to the Kingdom of Prussia at the Congress of Vienna. Since 1946, it has been part of the then newly founded state of Rhineland-Palatinate.

Politics

Municipal council
The council is made up of 6 council members, who were elected by majority vote at the municipal election held on 7 June 2009, and the honorary mayor as chairman.

Mayor
Roth's mayor is Thomas Walber.

Coat of arms
The German blazon reads: Gespalten durch eine eingeschweifte Spitze, darin ein silberner Pflug, vorn rot-silber geschacht, hinten in silber eine blaue heraldische Lilie.

The municipality's arms might in English heraldic language be described thus: Tierced in mantle, dexter chequy gules and argent, sinister argent a fleur-de-lis azure, and in base vert a plough of the second.

The charge on the sinister (armsbearer's left, viewer's right) side, the blue fleur-de-lis on the silver field, refers to Roth's first documentary mention in an 1100 directory of holdings from the Karden Foundation. The red and silver “chequy” pattern on the dexter (armsbearer's right, viewer's left) side is a reference to the village's former allegiance to the “Hinder” County of Sponheim. The silver plough on the green field refers not only to the great importance and tradition of agriculture in the municipality, but also to the origin of the village's name (“Roth” comes from the same root as the German verb roden, meaning “clear”, with reference to clearing land of trees for farming and settling).

The arms were designed by E. König and have been borne since 15 July 2002.

Culture and sightseeing

Buildings
The following are listed buildings or sites in Rhineland-Palatinate’s Directory of Cultural Monuments:
 Saint Leonard’s Catholic Church (Kirche St. Leonhard), Im Dorf 36 – aisleless church, 1661/1662, extension 18th century; outside tomb slab, 1621; whole complex of buildings with graveyard
 Hauptstraße 3 – former school; plastered building, partly timber-frame, about 1910
 Im Dorf 21 – timber-frame Quereinhaus (a combination residential and commercial house divided for these two purposes down the middle, perpendicularly to the street), earlier half of the 19th century
 Im Dorf 27 – estate complex; timber-frame house, partly solid or slated, early 19th century, timber-frame barn 19th century
 Im Dorf 46 – bakehouse, one-floor timber-frame building, 19th century
 Kastellauner Weg 1 – L-shaped estate; timber-frame house, partly slated, hipped mansard roof, early 19th century, timber-frame barn
 Bridge, on the path to the Günnewig Mühle (mill) – single-arch quarrystone bridge

Economy and infrastructure

Transport
Roth lies 800 m from the Hunsrückhöhenstraße (“Hunsrück Heights Road”, Bundesstraße 327, a scenic road across the Hunsrück built originally as a military road on Hermann Göring’s orders).

References

External links

 Municipality’s official webpage 

Municipalities in Rhineland-Palatinate
Rhein-Hunsrück-Kreis